Cordovano is a surname. Notable people with the surname include:

Sam Cordovano (1906–1995), American football player
Steven Cordovano, American role-playing game designer